Wide Open is the fifth studio album by American country music band Sawyer Brown. It was released in June 1988 on Capitol Records, and features the singles "My Baby's Gone", "It Wasn't His Child", and "Old Pair of Shoes". The title track was co-written by Alan LeBoeuf, one-third of Baillie & the Boys.

Track listing

Personnel 
Sawyer Brown
 Mark Miller – lead vocals
 Gregg "Hobie" Hubbard – keyboards, backing vocals 
 Bobby Randall – electric guitar, backing vocals
Jim Scholten – bass 
Joe "Curley" Smyth – drums, percussion

Additional musicians
 David Briggs – keyboards 
 Mark Casstevens – acoustic guitar
 Brent Rowan – guitars
 Sonny Garrish – steel guitar
 Jack Williams – bass
 Jerry Kroon – drums, percussion
 Terry McMillan – harmonica
 Buddy Spicher – fiddle
 The Jordanaires – backing vocals (1)
 Beckie Foster – backing vocals
 Beverly Randall – backing vocals

Production 
 Ron Chancey – producer 
 Blake Chancey – recording 
 Joe Scaife – recording 
 Billy Sherrill – recording 
 Hoot Borden – traffic engineer 
 John Abbott – assistant engineer 
 Paul Goldberg – assistant engineer 
 Rodney Good – assistant engineer 
 Greg Parker – assistant engineer 
 John Port – assistant engineer 
 Denny Purcell – mastering at Georgetown Masters (Nashville, Tennessee)
 Virginia Team – art direction, design
 Jerry Joyner – design 
 Mark Tucker – photography

Chart performance

External links
[ Wide Open] at Allmusic

1988 albums
Capitol Records albums
Sawyer Brown albums
Albums produced by Ron Chancey